Anabaena is a genus of filamentous cyanobacteria that exist as plankton. They are known for nitrogen-fixing abilities, and they form symbiotic relationships with certain plants, such as the mosquito fern. They are one of four genera of cyanobacteria that produce neurotoxins, which are harmful to local wildlife, as well as farm animals and pets. Production of these neurotoxins is assumed to be an input into its symbiotic relationships, protecting the plant from grazing pressure.

A DNA sequencing project was undertaken in 1999, which mapped the complete genome of Anabaena, which is 7.2 million base pairs long. The study focused on heterocysts, which convert nitrogen into ammonia. Certain species of Anabaena have been used on rice paddy fields, proving to be an effective natural fertilizer.

Nitrogen fixation by Anabaena

Under nitrogen-limiting conditions, vegetative cells differentiate into heterocysts at semiregular intervals along the filaments. Heterocyst cells are terminally specialized for nitrogen fixation. The interior of  these cells is micro-oxic as a result of increased respiration, inactivation of O2-producing photosystem (PS) II, and formation of a thickened envelope outside of the cell wall. Nitrogenase, sequestered within these cells, transforms dinitrogen into ammonium at the expense of ATP and reductant—both generated by carbohydrate metabolism, a process supplemented, in the light, by the activity of PS I. Carbohydrate, probably in the form of glucose, is synthesized in vegetative cells and moves into heterocysts. In return, nitrogen fixed in heterocysts moves into the vegetative cells, at least in part in the form of amino acids.

The fern Azolla,  forms a symbiotic relationship with the cyanobacterium Anabaena azollae, which fixes atmospheric nitrogen, giving the plant access to this essential nutrient. This has led to the plant being dubbed a "super-plant", as it can readily colonise areas of freshwater, and grow at great speed - doubling its biomass in as little as 1.9 days. The typical limiting factor on its growth is phosphorus, abundance of which, due to chemical runoff, often leads to Azolla blooms. Unlike other known plants, the symbiotic microorganism is transferred directly from one generation to the next. This has made Anabaena azollae completely dependent on its host, as several of its genes are either lost or has been transferred to the nucleus in Azolla's cells.

Primitive vision pigments studied in Anabaena
Anabaena is used as a model organism to study simple vision. The process in which light changes the shape of molecules in the retina, thereby driving the cellular reactions and signals that cause vision in vertebrates, is studied in Anabaena. Anabaena sensory rhodopsin, a specific light-sensitive membrane protein, is central to this research.

DNA repair

Double strand breaks (DSBs) are a type of DNA damage that can be repaired by homologous recombination.  This enzymatic repair process occurs in several enzymatic steps including an early step catalyzed by RecN protein.  A study of the dynamics of RecN in DSB repair in Anabaena indicated differential regulation of DSB repair so that it is active in vegetative cells but absent in mature heterocysts that are terminal cells.

References

Further reading 

 Eduardo Romero-Vivas, Fernando Daniel Von Borstel, Claudia Perez-Estrada, Darla Torres-Ariño, Francisco Juan Villa-Medina, Joaquin Gutierrez (2015) On-water remote monitoring robotic system for estimating patch coverage of Anabaena sp. filaments in shallow water ; Environ. Sci.: Processes Impacts 04/2015; DOI:10.1039/C5EM00097A

External links 
 
 
 Sequenced Anabaena Genomes

Nostocaceae
Cyanobacteria genera